Li Xiuming  is a mainland Chinese film actress. She won both of Golden Rooster Award and Hundred Flowers Award for Best Actress, for Xu Mao and His Daughters. Her most remembered role are "Chunmiao" in Xie Jin's Chunmiao and "Princess Peacock". In 1993, she retired from Beijing Studio.

Filmography
Chunmiao (1975)
Billows (1978)
The Great River Flows On (1978)
A Sweet Life (1979)
The Stars are Bright Tonight (1981)
Xu Mao and His Daughters (1981)
Princess Peacock (1982)
Your Smiles (1986)
The Dream of Red Mansions, Part 1, 2, 6 (1988–1989)

References

External links

1954 births
Living people
Actresses from Tianjin
Chinese television actresses
Chinese film actresses
20th-century Chinese actresses